Robert William Thomson (24 March 1934, Cheam, London UK – 20 November 2018, Oxford) was Calouste Gulbenkian Professor of Armenian Studies at Oxford University.

Thomson graduated from the University of Cambridge with a degree in classics, then studied at the Halki seminary in Turkey. Thomson received his PhD from Cambridge after defending his doctoral dissertation on Armenian and Syriac versions of Athanasius of Alexandria's works.

When an Armenian Studies Professorship was established in the Faculty of Arts and Sciences at the Harvard University in 1969, Thomson was appointed to the chair which was subsequently named in honor of Armenian saint and scholar Mesrob Mashtots. Thomson held this position until 1992, when he accepted the Gulbenkian Chair in Armenian Studies at Oxford University in England. He retired in 2001. In 1984–1989 he was the Director of the Dumbarton Oaks Research Library and Collection. In 1995, he was elected a fellow of the British Academy. Among other distinctions, he received the Saint Sahak and Saint Mesrop Medal from Vazgen I, Catholicos of All Armenians for his contributions to Armenian studies.

Thomson translated into English several Classical Armenian, Syriac and Greek texts as well as having written two textbooks on the Armenian language, one of which is the sole English-language textbook on Classical Armenian.

Thomson died in 2018.

Books

Studies
Studies in Armenian Literature and Christianity (Variorum, 1994)
Rewriting Caucasian History: The Mediaeval Armenian Adaptation of the Georgian Chronicles. The Original Georgian Texts and The Armenian Adaptation (Oxford, Clarendon Press, 1996)

Language textbooks
 An Introduction to Classical Armenian (Caravan Books, 1975)
 A Textbook of Modern Western Armenian (with Kevork B. Bardakjian) (Caravan Books, 1977)

Translations 
 The Historical Compilation of Vardan Arewelc'i, in: Dumbarton Oaks Papers 43 (1989), p. 125-226.
 The Armenian Adaptation of the Ecclesiastical History of Socrates Scholasticus [Hebrew University Armenian Texts and Studies, 3]. Translation of the Armenian with comparative study of the original and revised versions. Peeters Publishers, Leuven, 2001, Pp. xxii, 254.
 The Teaching of Saint Gregory (from Agathangelos's History of Armenia). New and revised edition of the 1970 Harvard University Press edition, New Rochelle, New York, 2001, Pp. viii, 267.
 Hamam, Commentary on the Book of Proverbs [Hebrew University Armenian Texts and Studies, 5]. Armenian text and English translation, with Introduction and extensive commentary, Peeters, Leuven 2005, Pp. vi, 307.
 Moses Khorenatsi, History of the Armenians. New and revised edition of the 1978 Harvard University Press edition, Caravan Books, Ann Arbor, 2006, Pp. xxi, 420.
 Nerses of Lambron, Commentary on the Book of Revelation [Hebrew University Armenian texts and Studies, 9]. English translation, with Introduction and commentary. Peeters Publishers, Leuven, 2007, Pp. xi, 225.

Footnotes 

Armenian studies scholars
Harvard University faculty
Statutory Professors of the University of Oxford
1934 births
2018 deaths
People from Cheam
Scottish Engineering Hall of Fame inductees